The AZAL PFK 2016–17 season was AZAL's twelfth Azerbaijan Premier League season, and thirteenth season in their history. It was their third full season with Tarlan Ahmadov as manager, during which they finished bottom of the league, with just 10 points, and were knocked out of the Azerbaijan Cup by Gabala at the Quarterfinal stage.

Squad

Transfers

Summer

In:

Out:

Winter

In:

Out:

Trialists:

Competitions

Azerbaijan Premier League

Results summary

Results

League table

Azerbaijan Cup

Squad statistics

Appearances and goals

|-
|colspan="14"|Players who left AZAL during the season:

|}

Goal scorers

Disciplinary record

References

External links 
 AZAL PFC Official Web Site
 AZAL PFC  at PFL.AZ
 AZAL PFC Official Facebook Page

AZAL PFC seasons
Azerbaijani football clubs 2016–17 season